The 1997–98 Richmond Spiders men's basketball team represented the University of Richmond in National Collegiate Athletic Association (NCAA) Division I college basketball during the 1997–98 season. Richmond competed as a member of the Colonial Athletic Association (CAA) under first-year head basketball coach John Beilein and played its home games at the Robins Center.

Richmond finished third in the CAA regular-season standings with a 12–4 conference record, and won the CAA tournament to earn an automatic bid to the 1998 NCAA tournament. In the opening round, the Spiders defeated the seventh-ranked, No. 3 seed South Carolina, 62–61, at the MCI Center in Washington, D.C. Richmond lost in the second round to No. 11 seed Washington, 81–66, to finish with a 23–8 record.

Roster

Schedule and results

|-
!colspan=9 style=| Non-Conference Regular season

|-
!colspan=9 style=| CAA Regular season

|-
!colspan=9 style=| Non-Conference Regular season

|-
!colspan=9 style=| CAA Regular season

|-
!colspan=9 style=| CAA Tournament

|-
!colspan=9 style=| NCAA Tournament

Awards and honors
Jarod Stevenson – CAA Player of the Year

References

Richmond Spiders men's basketball seasons
Richmond
1997 in sports in Virginia
1998 in sports in Virginia
Richmond